Damian is a surname. Notable people with the surname include:

 Cornel Damian (born 1960), Romanian Roman Catholic bishop
 Georgeta Damian (born 1976), Romanian rower and winner of four Olympic Gold medals
 Horia Damian (1922–2012), Romanian painter and sculptor
 Jean-Michel Damian (1947–2016), French radio journalist
 Mircea Damian (1899–1948), Romanian writer
 Michael Damian (born 1962), American singer and actor
 Pater Damiaan (1840–1889), Belgian missionary, probably named after the first martyr
 Saint Peter Damian (died 1072), Italian monk

Romanian-language surnames